The City National Bank Building (also known as the Langford Building) is a historic bank building in Miami, Florida. It is located at 121 Southeast 1st Street. On January 4, 1989, it was added to the U.S. National Register of Historic Places.  It was built shortly before the 1926 Miami hurricane which ended the early-20s real estate boom in Miami. In 2012 the building was sold and renovated to become a boutique Langford Hotel.

References

External links

 Dade County listings at National Register of Historic Places
 Florida's Office of Cultural and Historical Programs
 Dade County listings
 City National Bank Building
 Historic Preservation Miami
 Stambul Construction Blog - 121 SE 1st St. Miami - "The Miami National Bank" 

Buildings and structures in Miami
National Register of Historic Places in Miami
Bank buildings on the National Register of Historic Places in Florida